Gordon Burton is a Turks and Caicos Islander politician who has been speaker of the House of Assembly since 4 March 2021. He is a member of the Progressive National Party.

References 

Living people
Progressive National Party (Turks and Caicos Islands) politicians
Turks and Caicos Islands politicians
Members of the Turks and Caicos Islands House of Assembly
Speakers of the Turks and Caicos Islands House of Assembly
Year of birth missing (living people)